Cleburne County is a county located in the east central portion of the U.S. state of Alabama. As of the 2020 census, the population was 15,056. Its county seat is Heflin. Its name is in honor of Patrick R. Cleburne of Arkansas who rose to the rank of major general in the Confederate States Army. The eastern side of the county borders the state of Georgia.

History
Cleburne County was established on December 6, 1866, by an act of the state legislature.  The county was made from territory in Benton (now Calhoun), Randolph, and Talladega counties.  In 1867, Edwardsville was made the county seat.  An election was held in 1905 to move the county seat to Heflin.  The result of that election, which agreed to move the seat, was appealed to the Supreme Court, who decided on July 1, 1906, to uphold the election results.  Heflin is still the county seat.  Heflin was at one point thought of as a hub for nearby farmers to send their cotton.  Shortly after the Civil War, a group of northern investors created the town of Fruithurst in Cleburne County as part of a wine-growing project.  Fruithurst became a boomtown shortly thereafter.

Geography

It is the fourth-smallest county in Alabama by land area and second-largest by total area. Cleburne County is home to Alabama's highest natural point on Cheaha Mountain which is part of the southernmost mountain range in the Blue Ridge Mountains.

Adjacent counties
Cherokee County – north
Polk County, Georgia – northeast
Haralson County, Georgia – east
Carroll County, Georgia – southeast
Randolph County – south  
Clay County – southwest
Talladega County – southwest
Calhoun County – west

National protected area
 Talladega National Forest (part)

Transportation

Major highways
 Interstate 20
 U.S. Highway 78
 U.S. Highway 431
 State Route 9
 State Route 46
 State Route 281

Rail
Norfolk Southern Railway
Amtrak

Demographics

2020 census

As of the 2020 United States census, there were 15,056 people, 5,680 households, and 3,806 families residing in the county.

2010 census
As of the census of 2010, there were 14,972 people, 5,891 households, and 4,196 families living in the county. The population density was 27 people per square mile (10/km2).  There were 6,718 housing units at an average density of 11 per square mile (4/km2). The racial makeup of the county was 94.0% White (non-Hispanic), 3.3% Black or African American, 0.30% Native American, 0.1% Asian, 0.1% Pacific Islander, 1.0% from other races, and 1.1% from two or more races.  2.1% of the population were Hispanic or Latino of any race.

There were 5,891 households, out of which 28.7% had children under the age of 18 living with them, 56.2% were married couples living together, 10.3% had a female householder with no husband present, and 28.8% were non-families. 25.1% of all households were made up of individuals, and 11.2% had someone living alone who was 65 years of age or older.  The average household size was 2.51 and the average family size was 2.99.

In the county, the population was spread out, with 23.7% under the age of 18, 7.8% from 18 to 24, 24.6% from 25 to 44, 28.1% from 45 to 64, and 15.8% who were 65 years of age or older.  The median age was 40.6 years. For every 100 females there were 99.1 males.  For every 100 females age 18 and over, there were 100.9 males.

The median income for a household in the county was $36,077, and the median income for a family was $41,585. Males had a median income of $39,709 versus $26,229 for females. The per capita income for the county was $17,490.  About 11.6% of families and 17.1% of the population were below the poverty line, including 24.0% of those under age 18 and 13.7% of those age 65 or over.

2000 census
As of the census of 2000, there were 14,123 people, 5,590 households, and 4,125 families living in the county.  The population density was 25 people per square mile (10/km2).  There were 6,189 housing units at an average density of 11 per square mile (4/km2).  The racial makeup of the county was 89.74% White (non-Hispanic), 7.70% Black or African American, 0.30% Native American, 0.14% Asian, 0.01% Pacific Islander, 0.34% from other races, and 0.77% from two or more races.  3.40% of the population were Hispanic or Latino of any race.

There were 5,590 households, out of which 32.80% had children under the age of 18 living with them, 61.40% were married couples living together, 8.70% had a female householder with no husband present, and 26.20% were non-families. 23.00% of all households were made up of individuals, and 10.30% had someone living alone who was 65 years of age or older.  The average household size was 2.51 and the average family size was 2.95.

In the county, the population was spread out, with 24.30% under the age of 18, 8.20% from 18 to 24, 28.50% from 25 to 44, 25.30% from 45 to 64, and 13.70% who were 65 years of age or older.  The median age was 38 years. For every 100 females there were 99.30 males.  For every 100 females age 18 and over, there were 96.40 males.

The median income for a household in the county was $30,820, and the median income for a family was $35,579. Males had a median income of $29,752 versus $18,840 for females. The per capita income for the county was $14,762.  About 10.90% of families and 13.90% of the population were below the poverty line, including 16.10% of those under age 18 and 20.10% of those age 65 or over.

Education 
Cleburne County contains two public school districts. There are approximately 2,500 students in public PK-12 schools in Cleburne County. Much of the county is serviced by the single county school district, but the northern portion of the county falls under Piedmont City School District, the seat of which is in Calhoun County.

Districts 
School districts include:

 Cleburne County School District
 Piedmont City School District

Politics
Although not to the same extent as Winston or Chilton Counties, Cleburne County was at least in Presidential elections a Republican island in overwhelmingly Democratic Alabama during the "Solid South" era due to its unsuitable terrain for slave-based plantation agriculture. This led to considerable Populist support during the period of "Redemption" by white Democrats, which produced later support for the Republican Party even when in most of Alabama whites associated the "Party of Lincoln" with occupation and black political power.

Since the end of the dealigned political era of the 1960s and 1970s, Cleburne County has followed the same trajectory towards overwhelming Republican dominance as the rest of Appalachia: in 2020, Joe Biden gained nine percent of the county's vote, a figure less than George McGovern in his landslide 1972 defeat.

Communities

City
 Heflin (county seat)

Towns
 Edwardsville
 Fruithurst 
 Ranburne

Census-designated place
 Hollis Crossroads

Unincorporated communities
 Abel
 Abernathy
 Ai
 Arbacoochee
 Chulafinnee
 Hopewell
 Liberty Hill
 Muscadine
 Trickem

See also
National Register of Historic Places listings in Cleburne County, Alabama
Properties on the Alabama Register of Landmarks and Heritage in Cleburne County, Alabama
Shoal Creek Church
Cleburne County School District

References

External links
Cleburne County Chamber of Commerce

 

 
1866 establishments in Alabama
Counties of Appalachia
Populated places established in 1866